Lieutenant-General Sir (William) John Eldridge KBE CB DSO MC (2 March 1898 – 3 November 1985) was a senior British Army officer who became General Officer Commanding Aldershot District.

Military career
Eldridge was commissioned into the Royal Artillery in 1915 during World War I and served in France and Belgium.

After the War he was involved in operations in Iraq. He attended the Staff College, Camberley, alongside future general officers such as William Dimoline, Leslie Lockhart and Ashton Wade, from 1933 to 1934. He also served in World War II and was deployed to Italy in 1944.

He became Director General of Artillery at the Ministry of Supply in 1945 and Commandant of the Royal Military College of Science in 1948. He was made General Officer Commanding Aldershot District in 1951 and Controller of Munitions at the Ministry of Supply in 1953; he retired in 1957.

He was a Founder Member of the International Institute for Strategic Studies.

References

Bibliography

External links
Generals of World War II

|-
 

1898 births
1985 deaths
British Army personnel of World War I
British Army generals of World War II
Knights Commander of the Order of the British Empire
Companions of the Order of the Bath
Companions of the Distinguished Service Order
Recipients of the Military Cross
Royal Artillery officers
British Army lieutenant generals
Graduates of the Staff College, Camberley